Andrew Sebastian Benintendi (born July 6, 1994) is an American professional baseball outfielder for the Chicago White Sox of Major League Baseball (MLB). He has previously played in MLB for the Boston Red Sox, Kansas City Royals, and New York Yankees.

Benintendi played college baseball for the Arkansas Razorbacks of the University of Arkansas, where he won the Golden Spikes Award and Dick Howser Trophy in 2015. The Red Sox selected Benintendi in the first round of the 2015 MLB draft, and he made his MLB debut with the Red Sox in 2016. He was a part of the 2018 World Series champions. The Red Sox traded Benintendi to the Royals after the 2020 season. He won a Gold Glove Award in 2021 and was an All-Star in 2022. The Yankees acquired him from the Royals in 2022 and he signed with the White Sox as a free agent after the 2022 season.

Amateur career

Benintendi attended Madeira High School, in Madeira, Ohio. Playing for the school's baseball team, he batted .564 with 12 home runs, 57 runs batted in (RBIs), and 38 stolen bases for the Mustangs baseball team in his senior year. Benintendi was the ABCA/Rawlings National High School Player of the Year and Ohio Gatorade Baseball Player of the Year. He finished his high school career with an Ohio-record 199 career runs scored. He also played high school basketball, earning 2011–12 Cincinnati Enquirer Division III Co-Player of the Year honors and setting school records in career points (1,753) and season points (638), career three-pointers (180), and points per game in a season (25.5).

The Cincinnati Reds selected Benintendi in the 31st round of the 2013 Major League Baseball (MLB) draft, but he did not sign with the Reds. He enrolled at the University of Arkansas to play college baseball for the Arkansas Razorbacks baseball team. As a true freshman, he played in 61 games, with 60 starts and hit .276/.368/.333 with one home run and 27 RBIs.

In 2015, his junior year, Benintendi led the Southeastern Conference (SEC) in batting average (.380), home runs (19), on-base percentage (.489), slugging percentage (.715), and walks (47). He was named the SEC Player of the Year. He also won the Baseball America College Player of the Year Award, the Dick Howser Trophy, and the Golden Spikes Award.

Professional career

Boston Red Sox

2015–2017
The Boston Red Sox chose Benintendi with the seventh overall selection in the 2015 MLB draft. He signed with the Red Sox, receiving a $3.6 million signing bonus. Benintendi made his professional debut with the Lowell Spinners of the Class A-Short Season New York–Penn League. Andrew finished the 2015 season playing 19 games for the Class A Greenville Drive going 26/74 (.351) and posting an OPS of 1.011. He began the 2016 season with the Salem Red Sox of the Class A-Advanced Carolina League, and received a promotion to the Portland Sea Dogs of the Class AA Eastern League on May 15.

The Red Sox promoted Benintendi to the major leagues on August 2, 2016, straight from Double-A, only 421 days after being selected in the draft. He made his major league debut on August 2, against the Seattle Mariners as a pinch hitter, and recorded his first major league hit off of Hisashi Iwakuma on August 3. Benintendi recorded both his first major league triple and home run against the Detroit Tigers on August 21 in a 10–5 loss.

On October 6, in Game 1 of the 2016 ALDS against the Cleveland Indians, Benintendi hit a home run in his first postseason at bat, off of Indians' pitcher Trevor Bauer. With the feat, Benintendi became the youngest Red Sox player to hit a home run in a postseason game. However, the Indians won the game by a score of 5–4 and swept the series in three games. Benintendi ended the 2016 season with a .295 batting average, 31 hits, 14 RBIs, two home runs, and one stolen base in 34 games played.

Benintendi started the 2017 season as part of the Red Sox' Opening Day roster, batting second as Boston defeated the Pittsburgh Pirates by a score of 5–3. On July 4, against the Texas Rangers, Benintendi went 5-for-5 with 6 RBIs, two home runs, and a double in the 11–4 victory. He finished second in the American League Rookie of the Year voting, despite receiving no first-place votes due to Aaron Judge winning unanimously. Overall, during the 2017 Red Sox regular season, Benintendi batted .271 with 20 home runs, 90 RBIs and 20 stolen bases in 151 games played. In the ALDS against the eventual World Series champions, the Houston Astros, he batted .250 (4-for-16) with a home run and two RBIs in four games.

2018–2020
Through the first half of the season, he was the team's regular left fielder, usually batting second, behind Mookie Betts. On July 8, Benintendi was named as a candidate in the American League's All-Star Final Vote, for a spot in the 2018 MLB All-Star Game. At that point in the season, Benintendi had a slash line of .293/.379/.515 with 14 home runs and 55 RBIs. In the Final Vote, fans selected Jean Segura of the Seattle Mariners.
For the season Benintendi appeared in 148 games hitting .290 with 41 doubles, 103 runs scored, 16 home runs and 87 RBIs and stealing 21 bases.
In the 2018 MLB playoffs, Benintendi recorded the final outs to seal victories for the Red Sox in Games 4 and 5 of the 2018 American League Championship Series, the first of the two a diving effort to prevent a bases-loaded hit in a two-run game. The Red Sox won the World Series over the Los Angeles Dodgers, giving Benintendi his first championship title. In the World Series, Benintendi had four hits in Game 1 and hit .333 in series.

Benintendi began the 2019 season as Boston's regular left fielder. Manager Alex Cora initially made him the team's leadoff hitter, until the start of June when Cora moved Benintendi to second in the order, with Mookie Betts batting first, as was the team's usual order in 2018. On June 11, he was ejected, for the first time in his MLB career, for a comment he made about the home plate umpire (Ángel Hernández) that was heard by the first base umpire (Vic Carapazza). For the season, Benintendi appeared in 138 games, batting .266 with 40 doubles, 13 home runs and 68 RBIs.

On February 8, 2020, the Red Sox announced signing Benintendi to a two-year contract worth $10 million, avoiding arbitration. On July 29, he recorded the 500th hit of his major league career, a ground rule double off of New York Mets pitcher Jeurys Familia. Benintendi was placed on the 10-day injured list on August 12, with a right rib cage strain. Benintendi's 2020 campaign came to an end on September 8, after being transferred to the 45-day injury list. With the 2020 Red Sox, Benintendi was 4-for-39 at the plate (.103) with one RBI.

Kansas City Royals (2021–2022)
On February 10, 2021, the Red Sox traded Benintendi and cash considerations to the Kansas City Royals as part of a three-team trade in which the Red Sox acquired Franchy Cordero, Josh Winckowski, and three players to be named later (identified in June as minor league prospects: outfielder Freddy Valdez from the Mets, and pitchers Grant Gambrell and Luis De La Rosa from the Royals) while the New York Mets received Khalil Lee. In his first year with the Royals, Benintendi batted .276/.324/.442 with 17 home runs and 73 RBIs in 134 games. He led all left fielders with 1,116 innings played and a .987 fielding percentage, and won his first Gold Glove Award.

In salary arbitration, Benintendi was awarded a salary of $8.5 million for the 2022 season. He began the season batting .317 en route to being named the Royals' lone representative to the 2022 MLB All-Star Game.

New York Yankees (2022)
On July 27, 2022, the Royals traded Benintendi to the New York Yankees in exchange for minor league prospects T. J. Sikkema, Chandler Champlain, and Beck Way. On September 2, 2022, Benintendi was hit by a pitch on the right wrist and left the game. The next day, he was put on the 10-day injured list due to right wrist inflammation. Further evidence revealed that Benintendi had a broken hook in the hamate bone of his right wrist, which required surgery.

Chicago White Sox
On January 3, 2023, Benintendi signed a five-year contract worth $75 million with the Chicago White Sox.

Personal life 
Benintendi's paternal grandparents immigrated to the United States from Castellammare del Golfo, Sicily, Italy, where they settled and lived on Lama Ct in Gravesend, Brooklyn. He grew up a Cincinnati Reds fan.

Benintendi resides in St. Louis during the offseason and, during the 2019 Stanley Cup Finals, he voiced his support for the St. Louis Blues.

References

External links

 

Arkansas Razorbacks bio

1994 births
Living people
All-American college baseball players
American League All-Stars
American people of Italian descent
Arkansas Razorbacks baseball players
Baseball players from Cincinnati
Boston Red Sox players
Gold Glove Award winners
Greenville Drive players
Kansas City Royals players
Lowell Spinners players
Major League Baseball outfielders
New York Yankees players
People from Madeira, Ohio
Portland Sea Dogs players
Salem Red Sox players